Francis Holland may refer to:

 François Hollande (born 1954), French politician, former President of France
 Francis James Holland (1828–1907), Church of England priest

See also
 Francis Holland School, two separate independent day schools for girls in central London, England